The 2010 Major League Baseball postseason was the playoff tournament of Major League Baseball for the 2010 season. The winners of the League Division Series would move on to the League Championship Series to determine the pennant winners that face each other in the World Series.

In the American League, the New York Yankees returned for the fifteenth time in the past sixteen years, the Minnesota Twins returned for the sixth time in the past nine years, the Tampa Bay Rays returned for the second time in three years, and the Texas Rangers returned for the first time since 1999. This would be the first of three consecutive postseason appearances for the Rangers, and the last postseason appearance for the Twins until 2017.

In the National League, the Philadelphia Phillies returned to the postseason for the fourth straight time, the San Francisco Giants made their first postseason appearance since 2003, the Atlanta Braves returned for the first time since 2005, and the Cincinnati Reds made their first postseason appearance since 1995.

The postseason began on October 6, 2010, and ended on November 1, 2010, with the Giants defeating the Rangers in five games in the 2010 World Series, ending the Curse of Coogan's Bluff. It was the Giants' first title since 1954 and their sixth overall.

Playoff seeds
The following teams qualified for the postseason:

American League
 Tampa Bay Rays - 96–66, Clinched AL East
 Minnesota Twins - 94–68, Clinched AL Central
 Texas Rangers - 90–72, Clinched AL West
 New York Yankees - 95–67, Clinched Wild Card

National League
 Philadelphia Phillies - 97–65, Clinched NL East
 San Francisco Giants - 92–70, Clinched NL West
 Cincinnati Reds - 91–71, Clinched NL Central
 Atlanta Braves - 91–71, Clinched Wild Card

Playoff bracket

Note: Two teams in the same division could not meet in the division series.

American League Division Series

(1) Tampa Bay Rays vs. (3) Texas Rangers 

This was the first postseason meeting between the Rays and Rangers. In the first postseason series where neither team won a home game, the Rangers defeated the Rays in five games to advance to the ALCS for the first time in franchise history.

The Rangers dominated the first two games in Tampa, thanks to solid pitching performances from Cliff Lee and C. J. Wilson. When the series shifted to Arlington for Game 3, the Rangers possessed a 2-1 lead going into the eighth, but the Rays went on a 5-1 run through the eighth and ninth innings to win and avoid a sweep. In Game 4, the Rays jumped out to an early lead and did not relinquish it, sending the series back to Tampa for Game 5. However, Lee would yet again lead the Rangers to victory, pitching a complete game and giving the Rangers their first playoff series victory.

The Rays and Rangers met again in the ALDS the next year, which the Rangers also won.

(2) Minnesota Twins vs. (4) New York Yankees

This was the third postseason meeting between the Yankees and Twins (2003, 2004). The Yankees once again swept the Twins to advance to the ALCS for the second year in a row.

In Minneapolis, the Yankees stole Game 1 by a 6-4 score. In Game 2, Andy Pettitte helped lead the Yankees to victory in what would be his nineteenth and final postseason win. When the series moved to the Bronx, Phil Hughes and the Yankees bullpen held the Twins to one run scored to complete the sweep.

The Twins would not return to the postseason again until 2017.

National League Division Series

(1) Philadelphia Phillies vs. (3) Cincinnati Reds 

†: No-hitter by Roy Halladay

This was the first postseason meeting between these two teams since the 1976 NLCS, which the Reds won in a sweep en route to winning back-to-back titles. This time, the Phillies returned the favor, sweeping the Reds to advance to the NLCS for the third year in a row. 

This series was notable for a no-hitter thrown by Roy Halladay in Game 1, the first no-hitter in the postseason since Don Larsen's perfect game in the 1956 World Series. In Game 2, the Reds held a 4-0 lead, but the Phillies would rally with seven unanswered runs in the bottom the fifth, sixth, seventh, and eighth respectively to win and take a 2-0 series lead headed to Cincinnati. Cole Hamels pitched a complete game shutout for the Phillies in Game 3 to complete the sweep.

This was the last playoff series won by the Phillies until 2022.

(2) San Francisco Giants vs. (4) Atlanta Braves 

This was the second postseason meeting between these two teams. The Giants defeated the Braves in four games to return to the NLCS for the first time since 2002.

Giants' ace Tim Lincecum pitched a complete game shutout in Game 1, while the Braves evened the series with a one-run victory in Game 2. In Atlanta, the Giants narrowly prevailed in Game 3 to take a 2-1 series lead. Giants' rookie pitcher Madison Bumgarner helped close out the series in Game 4 in what would be his first of many postseason wins.

American League Championship Series

(3) Texas Rangers vs. (4) New York Yankees 

This was the fourth postseason meeting between the Rangers and Yankees. They had previously met in the ALDS in 1996, 1998, and 1999, which were all won by the Yankees. This time, the Rangers returned the favor, defeating the Yankees in six games to advance to the World Series for the first time in franchise history (in the process denying a rematch of the 1962 World Series).

Both teams split the first two games in Arlington - the Yankees overcame a 5-0 lead in Game 1 to win 6-5, and in Game 2, the Rangers won their first home postseason game in franchise history. When the series moved to the Bronx, the Rangers blew out the Yankees, 8-0, partly thanks to another solid pitching performance from Cliff Lee. The Rangers blew out the Yankees again in Game 4, 10-3, to take a 3-1 series lead. CC Sabathia and the Yankees' bullpen helped send the series back to Arlington with a 7-2 victory in Game 5. In Game 6, with the game tied at one going into the bottom of the fifth, Vladimir Guerrero and Nelson Cruz put the Rangers in the lead for good with a four-run fifth, effectively securing the pennant.

The Rangers would win the AL pennant again the next year against the Detroit Tigers in six games. The Yankees returned to the ALCS in 2012, but were swept by the Tigers.

National League Championship Series

(1) Philadelphia Phillies vs. (2) San Francisco Giants 

The Giants upset the heavily favored Phillies in six games to return to the World Series for the first time since 2002.

Both teams split the first two games in Philadelphia - Tim Lincecum and Giants' closer Brian Wilson led the Giants to an upset win in Game 1, while Roy Oswalt helped lead the Phillies to victory in Game 2 by pitching seven scoreless innings. When the series shifted to San Francisco, the Giants shut out the Phillies in Game 3 by a 3-0 score thanks to a solid pitching performance from Matt Cain. In Game 4, the Giants overcame multiple attempts by the Phillies offense to even the series, as they prevailed by one run in the bottom of the ninth inning to take a 3-1 series lead. The Phillies sent the series back to Philadelphia with a 4-2 victory in Game 5. In Game 6, the Phillies jumped out to an early 2-0 lead in the bottom of the first, however the Giants tied the game with a two-run third inning. No team scored a run until the top of the eighth, when San Francisco's Juan Uribe hit a solo home run to put the Giants in the lead for good. Brian Wilson then struck out Philadelphia's Ryan Howard looking in the bottom of the ninth to clinch the pennant for the Giants.

This was the last NLCS appearance by the Phillies until 2022. The Giants would win two more NL pennants during the decade, in 2012 and 2014, both against the St. Louis Cardinals.

2010 World Series

(AL3) Texas Rangers vs. (NL2) San Francisco Giants 

This was the eighth postseason meeting in North American sports history between teams from the San Francisco Bay Area and the Dallas-Ft. Worth Metroplex. The other meetings were in the NFL Playoffs, during the heyday of the 49ers–Cowboys rivalry from 1971 to 1995.

In the first World Series ever played in the Dallas-Ft. Worth Metroplex, the Giants defeated the Rangers in five games to win their first World Series title since 1954, ending the Curse of Coogan's Bluff.

In Game 1, the Giants prevailed in an offensive duel by an 11-7 score. In Game 2, the Giants blew out the Rangers, 9-0, thanks to another solid pitching performance from Matt Cain. When the series moved to Arlington, the Rangers won Game 3 by a 4-2 score to win their first World Series game. In Game 4, Madison Bumgarner helped the Giants shut out the Rangers again to take a 3-1 series lead, as Bumgarner became the fourth-youngest pitcher to win a World Series game at the age of 21. In Game 5, thanks to a solid pitching effort from Tim Lincecum and closer Brian Wilson, the Giants prevailed by a 3-1 score to end their long World Series title drought. 

This was the first championship won by a team from the San Francisco Bay Area since 1995, when the San Francisco 49ers won Super Bowl XXIX. It was also the first World Series title for the Bay Area since 1989, which was won by the Oakland Athletics, who ironically swept the Giants that year. 

This marked the start of a dynasty for the Giants, as they would win the World Series again in 2012 against the Detroit Tigers, and in 2014 against the Kansas City Royals. The Rangers would return to the World Series the next year, but fell to the St. Louis Cardinals in seven games.

References

External links
 League Baseball Standings & Expanded Standings – 2010

 
Major League Baseball postseason